Ally is a science fiction novel by British writer Karen Traviss, published in March 2007. It is the fifth book in the Wess'Har Series.

Plot
The day of reckoning is rapidly approaching when the powerful Eqbas will remake the Earth at the expense of its dominant species. And Shan Frankland—once a police officer, once human, now something much more—must decide where her loyalties truly lie: among the gethes, on a planet she once called home, or here, where a dying species presents her with a new and unexpected crisis.

Awards and nominations
Ally was a finalist for the 2008 Philip K. Dick Award.

References

2007 British novels
Wess'Har series
Novels by Karen Traviss
HarperCollins books